The 1983–84 Bulgarian Hockey League season was the 32nd season of the Bulgarian Hockey League, the top level of ice hockey in Bulgaria. Five teams participated in the league, and HK CSKA Sofia won the championship.

Standings

External links
 Season on hockeyarchives.info

Bulgaria
Bulgarian Hockey League seasons
Bulg